Paris-Colmar is an annual racewalking competition covering about 445 kilometers for men, and 300 kilometers for women and for men who participate for the first time. The competition began in 1926 as race from Strasbourg to Paris. The  contest for women has been held since 1988.

The race presently starts in Neuilly-sur-Marne (Seine-Saint-Denis) for the men and in Châlons-en-Champagne (Marne) for the women. They arrive in Colmar after more than 50 hours of racewalking. Special breaks are included to exchange food and clothing. In 2007, the prize for the winner in the men's contest 8,000 euros and 5,000 euros for women. The current participants are largely from Eastern Europe. A prospective contestant must qualify for the Paris-Colmar competition by walking a certain distance in 24 hours.

Hervé Delarras and Roger Quemener, are respectively director and vice director of the event and of the Cercle des sports de France club.

The competition was stopped :
 From 1938 to 1948,
 From 1960 to 1969,
 in 2004 and 2010.

In 2015 the final destination will switch to Ribaeauville, a few miles North of Colmar. All races in the history of the event have been between Paris and the Alsace region bordering Germany.

Palmarès

1926 to 1937 : Paris-Strasbourg

1949 to 1959 : Paris-Strasbourg or Strasbourg-Paris

1970 to 1980 : Paris-Strasbourg or Strasbourg-Paris

From 1981 : Paris-Colmar 

 2003 start of Paris-Colmar from 4 to 7 June.

 2004 not occurred
 2005 start Paris-Colmar from 8 to 11 June

 2006 start Paris-Colmar from 31 May to 3 June.

 2007 start Paris-Colmar from 7 to 10 June.

 2008 start Paris-Colmar from 18 to 21 June.

Distance 444 km, women 305.7 km, and Promotion 292.3 km.

 2009 start Paris-Colmar from 18 to 21 June.

Distance 471.5 km, women and promotion 316.8 km.

 2010 did not occur
 2011 start Paris-Colmar from 22 to 25 June.

Distance 439.3 km, women and promotion 297.7 km.

 2012 

 2013 

 2014 

 2015 start Paris-Ribeauville from 3 to 6 June

Interwiki

External links
 Official website

Ultramarathons in France
Racewalking competitions
International sports competitions hosted by Paris
Sport in Colmar
Recurring sporting events established in 1926
Annual events in Paris
Annual sporting events in France
1926 establishments in France